Anthony Jackson may refer to:

Anthony Jackson (musician) (born 1952), American electric bass player
Anthony Jackson (actor) (1944–2006), English actor
Sir Anthony Jackson (soldier) (1599–1666), English lawyer, soldier and knight
Sir Anthony Mather-Jackson (1899–1983), British cricketer 
Anthony Jackson (paediatrician) (1918–2005), British paediatrician, pioneer in the management of cystic fibrosis
Anthony Tyson Jackson (born 1986), American football defensive end

See also

Tony Jackson (disambiguation)